Masdevallia wageneriana is a species of orchid found from Colombia into northern Venezuela.

wageneriana